Concerted activity may refer to:

the concept of protected concerted activity in labor law
one of the two types of tacit collusion
combined effect of enzymes as in case of IRS1 and IGF1R